Richard Musgrave may refer to:

 Richard Musgrave (economist) (1910–2007), American economist of German heritage
 Richard Musgrave (died 1555) (1524–1555), MP for Cumberland
 Sir Richard Musgrave, 1st Baronet (1535–1615), English politician
 Sir Richard Musgrave, 1st Baronet, of Tourin (1757–1818), Irish politician and writer
 Sir Richard Musgrave, 3rd Baronet, of Hayton Castle (c1675–1711), MP for Cumberland 1701 and 1702–08
 Sir Richard Musgrave, 3rd Baronet, of Tourin (1790–1859), Irish politician, MP for County Waterford 1831–32 and 1835–37
 Sir Richard Musgrave, 11th Baronet (1838–1881), English politician
 Richard Adolphus Musgrave (died 1841), English clergyman, Canon of Windsor

See also 
 Musgrave (surname)
 Musgrave baronets